Lauro Amadò (3 March 1912 – 6 June 1971), also known as Lajo, was a Swiss football player.

Career 

Amadò was born in Lugano. He played 54 international games for the Switzerland national football team and scored 21 goals. The striker took part in three games at the 1938 FIFA World Cup.

Clubs
1930-1932 FC Lugano
1932-1934 Servette Genf
1934-1940 FC Lugano
1940-1949 Grasshopper Club Zürich

Honours
Swiss League Champion: 1933, 1938, 1942, 1943, 1945
Swiss Cup: 1931, 1941, 1942, 1943, 1946
NLA Top scorer: 1943, 1947

References

Swiss men's footballers
Switzerland international footballers
1912 births
1971 deaths
1938 FIFA World Cup players
Servette FC players
FC Lugano players
Grasshopper Club Zürich players
Swiss football managers
FC Chiasso managers
Sportspeople from Lugano
Association football forwards